The Prodrive P2 is a prototype two-seater sports car designed, engineered and built by Prodrive at its Banbury and Warwick sites. The car is based on the platform of the Subaru R1 kei car and has a modified Subaru Impreza WRX STi engine along with many Prodrive systems originally designed for their World Championship and Sports Car Racing programmes. The car's styling was done by Peter Stevens, who also designed the McLaren F1. The car includes rally-inspired anti-lag to prevent turbo lag, as well as an active center and active rear differential that maximizes grip.

It also made Jeremy Clarkson appear to vomit after driving around a circle of cones  extremely rapidly to demonstrate its computer-controlled differential system's anti-understeer capabilities.

The car's active rear differential automatically shifts torque to whichever of the rear wheels needs it most during manoeuvring, based on spin-slip sensor readings; this is a common rally-car technology rarely seen on road cars. Prodrive has claimed that the car could retail for around £40,000, but has said there are no plans to put the car into production at present.

References

External links 
Prodrive P2: The Evil Subaru
Prodrive page on the P2
Jeremy Clarkson Top Gear test

Subaru vehicles
Concept cars
All-wheel-drive vehicles
Sports cars